Euchlaena serrata, the saw-wing moth, is a species of moth of the  family Geometridae. It is found in eastern North America.

The outer third of both wings is reddish-brown and the inner two-thirds is light yellow. Adults are on wing from April to August.

The larvae feed on Pyrus, Malus, Acer and Vaccinium species.

References

Moths described in 1770
Angeronini
Taxa named by Dru Drury